Deltacoronavirus (Delta-CoV) is one of the four genera (Alpha-, Beta-, Gamma-, and Delta-) of coronaviruses. It is in the subfamily Orthocoronavirinae of the family Coronaviridae. They are enveloped, positive-sense, single-stranded RNA viruses. Deltacoronaviruses infect mostly birds and some mammals.

While the alpha and beta genera are derived from the bat viral gene pool, the gamma and delta genera are derived from the avian and pig viral gene pools.

Recombination appears to be common among deltacoronaviruses.  Recombination occurs frequently in the viral genome region that encodes the host receptor binding protein.  Recombination between different viral lineages contributes to the emergence of new viruses capable of interspecies transmission and adaptation to new animal hosts.

See also
RNA virus
Sense (molecular biology)
Veterinary virology

References

External links
 Viralzone: Deltacoronavirus
 Virus Pathogen Database and Analysis Resource (ViPR): Coronaviridae

 
Virus genera
Coronaviruses